"Run" is a song by German production group Sash!. The record was released on 28 October 2002 via Virgin Records as the second single from their fourth studio album S4!Sash!. The record features vocal parts by British artist Boy George.

Track listing

Charts

References

External links

2002 singles
2002 songs
Eurodance songs
Virgin Records singles
Songs written by Boy George